Anthony Granville Greig (born 22 July 1941) is a former lightweight freestyle wrestler from New Zealand. He won a bronze medal at the 1966 British Empire and Commonwealth Games, and was eliminated in the second bout at the 1964 Summer Olympics.

References

External links
 

1941 births
Living people
Wrestlers at the 1966 British Empire and Commonwealth Games
Commonwealth Games bronze medallists for New Zealand
Olympic wrestlers of New Zealand
Wrestlers at the 1964 Summer Olympics
New Zealand male sport wrestlers
Commonwealth Games medallists in wrestling
Medallists at the 1966 British Empire and Commonwealth Games